The Cal Shaw Stone Row House is a stone row house located on Central Street in Tonopah, Nevada, United States. Property owner Cal Shaw built the house in 1906 next to the Cal Shaw Adobe Duplex, which was built the previous year. While the house was built with stone instead of adobe, it features a similar design to the adobe house, particularly in its projecting roof and porch supported by columns. The house and its neighbor reflect the variety of homes built on Central Street, one of the earliest residential areas in Tonopah. In addition, the house's detailed and well-preserved design led a local historic survey to call it "one of the best preserved examples of stone residential construction in Tonopah".

The house was added to the National Register of Historic Places on May 20, 1982.

References

Houses completed in 1906
Houses on the National Register of Historic Places in Nevada
National Register of Historic Places in Tonopah, Nevada
Houses in Nye County, Nevada
Tonopah, Nevada
1906 establishments in Nevada